Gunayan is a Neotropical genus of firetips in the family Hesperiidae.

Species
Gunayan rhacia (Hewitson, 1875) Brazil, Venezuela
Gunayan rubricollis (Sepp, [1841]) Brazil, Suriname
Gunayan timaeus (Bell, 1931) Peru

References

Natural History Museum Lepidoptera genus database

External links
images representing Gunayan  at Consortium for the Barcode of Life

Hesperiidae genera
Hesperiidae of South America